Yuri Yuryevich "Krash" Krasheninnikov (born 19 December 1984) is a Russian beach soccer player currently active as defender. He is Merited Master of Sports of Russia.

Career 
Krasheninnikov graduated from the public school Nr. 453 in Vyborg Rayon. One of his first coaches was Vyacheslav Ivanovich Bulavin.

He started playing for the association football club Zenit. He finished the football school Moscow Outpost, there his coach was Dmitry Yuryevich Stepannikov. Krasheninnikov played for beach soccer clubs including TIM and IBS. Since 2009, he plays for his national team, winning with them numerous trophies. Two years later he joined Lokomotiv Moscow, and since 2014 he plays for Kristall. Krasheninnikov played for the Brazilian Corinthians at the 2012 Mundialito de Clubes.

On 21 December 2012, Krasheninnikov was named Merited Master of Sports by the order of the Sports Minister.

Achievements

National team
 FIFA Beach Soccer World Cup champion: 2011, 2013, 2021
 Euro Beach Soccer Cup champion: 2010, 2012
 Euro Beach Soccer League champion: 2009, 2011, 2013, 2014, 2017

Clubs
 Russian National champion: 2010, 2011, 2012, 2015, 2016, 2018, 2019, 2021
 Russian Cup champion: 2011, 2012, 2013, 2015
 Russian Super Cup: 2011

Individually
 2019 FIFA Beach Soccer World Cup qualification – Most Valuable Player
 Merited Master of Sports (21 December 2012)

References

External links
Profile on Beach Soccer Russia
 Krasheninnikov's profile on Kristall

Russian beach soccer players
1984 births
Living people
Sportspeople from Saint Petersburg
European Games gold medalists for Russia
Beach soccer players at the 2015 European Games
European Games medalists in beach soccer
Beach soccer players at the 2019 European Games